William Basil Percy Feilding, 7th Earl of Denbigh, 6th Earl of Desmond, GCH, PC (25 March 1796 – 25 June 1865), styled Viscount Feilding between 1799 and 1800, was a British peer and courtier.

Background and education
Feilding was the eldest son of William Feilding, Viscount Feilding and his wife, Anne Catherine Powys. He was born at Berwick House (his maternal grandparents' family seat) near Shrewsbury, Shropshire, and educated at Eton and Trinity College, Cambridge, where he graduated MA in 1816.

In 1799, Feilding's father died and his grandfather also a year later, whereupon Feilding inherited the latter's title.

Career
From 1830, Lord Denbigh was a Gentleman of the Bedchamber to William IV. In 1833, he was made a GCH, admitted to the Privy Council and transferred to Queen Adelaide's Household, first as her Lord Chamberlain, then as Master of the Horse. He was made a DL for Warwickshire in 1825 and received an honorary degree from Oxford University as DCL in 1835.

Family
Lord Denbigh married Lady Mary Elizabeth Kitty Moreton, daughter of Thomas Reynolds-Moreton, 1st Earl of Ducie, on 8 May 1822. They had eleven children:

Rudolph William Basil, Viscount Feilding, later 8th Earl of Denbigh (1823–1892) (maternal grandfather of Simon Elwes, great-grandfather of Dominick Elwes and great-great-grandfather of Cary Elwes, Damian Elwes and Cassian Elwes).
Lady Mary Frances Catherine (twin, 1823–1896)
Lady Augusta Emily Julia (1825–1848)
Percy Robert Basil (1827–1904), soldier.
Lady Jane Lissey Harriet (1829–1912), married Capt. Theophilus John Levett of Wychnor Hall.
Geoffrey William Penn (1832–1843)
Charles William Alexander (1833–1893), clergyman.
William Henry Adelbert (1836–1895), soldier.
Lady Adelaide Emily (1836–1870), married Charles Archibald Murray, and by his father Charles, grandson of David William Murray, 3rd Earl of Mansfield. They had two sons and two daughters.
Lady Ida Matilda Alice (1840–1915), married William Malcolm Low, Esq. (parents-in-law of Sir William Mount, 1st Baronet and great-great-grandparents of former Prime Minister of the United Kingdom David Cameron).
Lady Kathleen Elizabeth Mary Julia (1842–1882), married Charles Meysey Bolton Clive, son of Rev. Archer Clive (son of Edward Clive MP). They had three sons and three daughters.

Lord Denbigh died in 1865 and his titles passed to his eldest son, Rudolph.

References

External links
 

1796 births
1865 deaths
People educated at Eton College
Alumni of Trinity College, Cambridge
Members of the Privy Council of the United Kingdom
William
Earls of Denbigh
Desmond, William Feilding, 6th Earl of